Jorge Nasser (born 6 December 1956) is a Uruguayan singer, productor and composer. 

He used to be a member of the band Níquel.

References

External links

 Website

1956 births
Uruguayan people of Lebanese descent
20th-century Uruguayan male singers
Uruguayan composers
Male composers
Living people
21st-century Uruguayan male singers